"Sober" is a song by American rapper G-Eazy, featuring vocals from American singer-songwriter Charlie Puth. It was released via RCA Records on December 8, 2017, as the third single from G-Eazy's third studio album, The Beautiful & Damned. Puth produced the song with Dakari and the Futuristics, and they wrote the song with G-Eazy alongside Matt Dragstrem and Edgar Machuca.

Background
G-Eazy revealed the album's full track listing alongside the single release. Talking about how the collaboration came together, Eazy told MTV News: "Charlie is one of the most talented individuals in music. He's a really special artist. We met a while ago when we're touring in Europe, and we're playing venues right next to each other. We clicked up that night and just talked and just vibed, and I found out he is a huge fan of the Bay Area hip hop, it was a huge new found respect for him on that level." He also explained his reasoning for the title of the song, saying: "I try to illustrate both sides, you know what I mean? There's definitely the fun side of going out and partying. I'm out all the time. But then there's also that reality of — I try to paint the picture of the other side, living with that [feeling], what did I do last night? But it's all about finding that medium, and I think that's ultimately [the meaning of] The Beautiful & Damned, is to not end up way out there, and to keep yourself in check and try to find that balance, find moderation, or whatever."

In an interview with Billboard, Puth said that he wrote the song with Breyan Issac and Ester Dean in 2015, which was a dark point in his life, and that he had someone in mind when he wrote it. He continued: "You never know where these songs are gonna go. I had originally written verses, like sing-y verses, and it just didn't feel right. It felt like it needed an Eminem type story. When I heard G's verses on it, they just happened to be something similar to what I went through. There is no other person who could have done it better than G. I love G. Young Gerald, Eazy season. He's my tallest friend."

Critical reception
Megan Armstrong of Billboard made the metaphor of G-Eazy's rapping being "the devil on one shoulder" and Puth's voice being "the angel on the other [shoulder]". She praised both artists for playing off their contrast in styles. Deepa Lakshmin of MTV News felt "G-Eazy's rap verses blend perfectly with Puth's smooth vocals". Mike Wass of Idolator regarded the song as "a bro-anthem" and "an ode to, and a cautionary tale about, drunken nights". He praised Puth for providing "an instantly hummable chorus".

Credits and personnel
Credits adapted from Tidal.
 G-Eazy – songwriting
 Charlie Puth – songwriting, production
 Breyan Isaac – songwriting
 The Futuristics – songwriting, production
 Ester Dean – songwriting
 Matt Dragstrem – songwriting
 Dakarai Gwitira – songwriting, production, record engineering
 Edgar Machuca – songwriting
 Jaycen Joshua – mix engineering
 Ben Milchev – engineering assistance
 David Nakaji – engineering assistance

Charts

Certifications

Release history

References

2017 songs
2017 singles
G-Eazy songs
Charlie Puth songs
RCA Records singles
Songs written by Breyan Isaac
Songs written by Ester Dean
Songs written by Charlie Puth
Song recordings produced by the Futuristics
Songs written by Joe Khajadourian
Songs written by Alex Schwartz
Songs written by Matt Dragstrem
Songs written by G-Eazy